Roman Güntensperger (born 18 January 1991) is a Swiss footballer who plays for Bellinzona in the Swiss Super League.

Career
Güntensperger began playing for Zürich and St. Gallen at under-21 level. He played in the Challenge League with Kriens and Bellinzona before a brief spell with Gaziantep B.B. He currently plays at FC Rapperswil-Jona in the Swiss Challenge League.

Family
Güntensperger is the son of Erich Güntensperger.

Net Worth
Gütensperger's net worth is about $1 million-$7 million just by playing soccer alone.

References

External links

1991 births
Living people
Swiss men's footballers
SC Kriens players
AC Bellinzona players
Gaziantep F.K. footballers
Association football forwards
Swiss expatriate footballers
Expatriate footballers in Turkey
FC Rapperswil-Jona players